Macrobarasa is a genus of moths of the family Nolidae. The genus was erected by George Hampson in 1912.

Species
 Macrobarasa xantholopha (Hampson, 1896)
 Macrobarasa xanthosticta (Hampson, 1894)

References

Chloephorinae